MIND is a quarterly peer-reviewed academic journal published by Oxford University Press on behalf of the Mind Association. Having previously published exclusively philosophy in the analytic tradition, it now "aims to take quality to be the sole criterion of publication, with no area of philosophy, no style of philosophy, and no school of philosophy excluded." Its institutional home is shared between the University of Oxford and University College London.  It is considered an important resource for studying  philosophy.

History and profile
The journal was established in 1876 by the Scottish philosopher Alexander Bain (University of Aberdeen) with his colleague and former student George Croom Robertson (University College London) as editor-in-chief. With the death of Robertson in 1891, George Stout took over the editorship and began a 'New Series'. Early on, the journal was dedicated to the question of whether psychology could be a legitimate natural science. In the first issue, Robertson wrote:

Throughout the 20th century, the journal was leading in the publishing of analytic philosophy. In 2015, under the auspices of its new editors-in-chief Lucy O'Brien (University College London) and Adrian William Moore (University of Oxford), it started accepting papers from all styles and schools of philosophy.

Many famous essays have been published in Mind by such figures as Charles Darwin, J. M. E. McTaggart and Noam Chomsky. Three of the most famous, arguably, are Lewis Carroll's "What the Tortoise Said to Achilles" (1895), Bertrand Russell's "On Denoting" (1905), and Alan Turing's "Computing Machinery and Intelligence" (1950), in which he first proposed the Turing test.

Editors-in-chief
The following persons have been editors-in-chief:
1876–1891: George Croom Robertson
1891–1920: George Frederic Stout
1921–1947: George Edward Moore
1947–1972: Gilbert Ryle
1972–1984: David Hamlyn
1984–1990: Simon Blackburn
1990–2000: Mark Sainsbury
2000–2005: Michael Martin
2005–2015: Thomas Baldwin
2015–present: Adrian William Moore and Lucy O'Brien

Notable articles

Late 19th century 
 "A Biographical Sketch of an Infant" (1877) – Charles Darwin
 "What is an Emotion?" (1884) – William James
 "What the Tortoise Said to Achilles" (1895) – Lewis Carroll

Early 20th century 
 "The Refutation of Idealism" (1903) – G. E. Moore
 "On Denoting" (1905) – Bertrand Russell
 "The Unreality of Time" (1908) – J. M. E. McTaggart
 "Does Moral Philosophy Rest on a Mistake?" (1912) – H. A. Prichard

Mid 20th century 
 "The Emotive Meaning of Ethical Terms" (1937) – Charles Leslie Stevenson
 "Studies in the Logic of Confirmation" (1945) – Carl G. Hempel
 "The Contrary-to-Fact Conditional" (1946) – Roderick M. Chisholm
 "Computing Machinery and Intelligence" (1950) – Alan Turing
 "On Referring" (1950) – P. F. Strawson (online)
 "Deontic Logic" (1951) – G. H. von Wright
 "The Identity of Indiscernibles" (1952) – Max Black
 "Evil and Omnipotence" (1955) – J. L. Mackie
 "Proper Names" (1958) – John Searle

Late 20th century 
 "On the Sense and Reference of a Proper Name" (1977) – John McDowell
 "Fodor's Guide to Mental Representation" (1985) – Jerry Fodor
 "The Humean Theory of Motivation" (1987) – Michael Smith
 "Can We Solve the Mind–Body Problem?" (1989) – Colin McGinn
 "Conscious Experience" (1993) – Fred Dretske
 "Language and Nature" (1995) – Noam Chomsky

See also
 List of philosophy journals
 The Monist

References

External links 
 
 Access to 1876–1922 volumes

Philosophy of mind journals
English-language journals
Publications established in 1876
Quarterly journals
Oxford University Press academic journals
Academic journals associated with learned and professional societies
1876 establishments in Scotland